The Ladies Hannover Expo 2000 Open was a women's professional golf tournament on the Ladies European Tour that took place at Rethmar Golf Links in Germany.

Winners

References

External links
Ladies European Tour

Former Ladies European Tour events
Golf tournaments in Germany